John Celestand (born March 6, 1977) is a retired American professional basketball player.

A 6'4" (1.93 m) point guard, Celestand attended Piscataway Township High School in Piscataway, New Jersey before playing collegiately at Villanova University. Celestand was selected by the Los Angeles Lakers with the No. 30 overall pick of the 1999 NBA Draft. He was a member of the Lakers' 1999–2000 championship team, and has spent several years playing professionally in Italy—for Skipper Bologna for two months in late 2001—, France and Germany.

Celestand is currently living in New Jersey. He is the co-owner of the company All-State Basketball where he trains young aspiring basketball players in Central New Jersey.  He works as an announcer for ESPN Plus  and ESPNU covering college basketball games. He is also a studio analyst on 76ers Post Game Live for Comcast Sportsnet Philadelphia.  In addition John is the color analyst for IMG College Radio covering the National Big East Game of the Week and MSG Varsity covering high school basketball in New Jersey.

A former coach of the Central Jersey Jammers AAU team based in New Brunswick, New Jersey, he still helps out with various basketball organizations around central New Jersey. He is a member of the "I Can Foundation" a non-profit organization created in 2005 to encourage the importance of literacy among inner city youth and also works as a motivational speaker throughout New Jersey.  In addition John works with Heroes and Cool Kids, a non-profit company based in North Jersey which mentors high school student-athletes.  He is also a program associate with the Rutgers Future Scholars program mentoring future first generation college  students in the New Brunswick and Piscataway, NJ areas.

John also serves as President of his own company Celestand Consulting.  Through Celestand Consulting, John does motivational speaking and puts together seminars on education and character development all across the tri-state area.  Mr. Celestand has been a featured speaker at Columbia University, Rutgers University, Villanova University, Rider University, Drexel University, Middlesex County College and Kean University.  He has also spoken at over 30 high schools and middle schools all across the state of New Jersey.

References

External links
John Celestand profile @ nba.com
John Celestand - Draft Review

1977 births
Living people
African-American basketball players
Alba Berlin players
American expatriate basketball people in France
American expatriate basketball people in Germany
American expatriate basketball people in Italy
American expatriate basketball people in Ukraine
American men's basketball players
ASVEL Basket players
Basketball Löwen Braunschweig players
Basketball players from New Jersey
Basketball players from Houston
BC Kyiv players
Fortitudo Pallacanestro Bologna players
Los Angeles Lakers draft picks
Los Angeles Lakers players
New Mexico Slam players
People from Piscataway, New Jersey
Piscataway High School alumni
Shooting guards
Sportspeople from Middlesex County, New Jersey
Villanova Wildcats men's basketball players
21st-century African-American sportspeople
20th-century African-American sportspeople